Watching in Silence is the debut astudio album by the American heavy metal band Circle II Circle, released in 2003. It featured guest appearances from lead vocalist Zachary Stevens's former band mates from Savatage, Jon Oliva and Chris Caffery, who co-wrote most of the songs on the album.

Track listing 
"Out of Reach" (Chris Caffery, Jon Oliva, Zachary Stevens) – 4:09
"Sea of White" (Caffery, Stevens) – 4:39
"Into the Wind" (Caffery, Matt LaPorte, Stevens) – 4:18
"Watching in Silence" (Oliva, Stevens) – 4:25
"Forgiven" (Oliva, Stevens) – 5:02
"Lies" (LaPorte, Oliva, Stevens) – 3:26
"Face to Face" (Caffery, Stevens) – 5:12
"Walls" (Oliva, Stevens) – 4:28
"The Circle" (Oliva, Stevens) – 3:30
"F.O.S. (Fields of Sorrow)" (Oliva, Stevens) – 6:39

Personnel 
Circle II Circle
Zachary Stevens – lead vocals, producer, cover concept
Matt LaPorte – guitars
John Zahner – keyboards
Kevin Rothney – bass guitar, backing vocals
Christopher Kinder – drums

Additional musicians
Jon Oliva – vocals, keyboards, producer
Chris Caffery – guitars on "Out of Reach", "Sea of White" and "Face to Face"

Production
Jim Morris – co–producer, engineer, mixing with Circle II Circle, mastering
Dan Campbell – executive producer, cover concept, design & artwork, management
Thomas Ewerhard – design & artwork

References 

2003 debut albums
Circle II Circle albums
AFM Records albums